Look of Love: The Very Best of ABC is a compilation album by English synth-pop band ABC, release on November 6, 2001. Although essentially a reissue of greatest hits package Absolutely (which was released in 1990), the album featured two new songs by Fry titled "Peace and Tranquility" and "Blame". A companion DVD, along with a bonus disc of remixes was also released.

Track listing

Disc one

Disc two

Personnel 
 Martin Fry – vocals
 Stephen Singleton – alto and tenor saxophones
 Mark White – guitars, keyboards, programming
 Mark Lickley – bass guitar
 David Palmer – drums, percussion
 Fiona Russell Powell – vocals
 David Yarritu – vocals

Charts

References

ABC (band) albums
2001 compilation albums
2001 video albums
Music video compilation albums
Mercury Records compilation albums
Polydor Records compilation albums
Universal Music Group compilation albums
Mercury Records video albums
Universal Music Group video albums